Wardhouse Castle was a 13th-century tower house, about  west of Insch, Aberdeenshire, Scotland.
The castle was called Weredors, Wardes Castle  or simply Wardhouse.

History
Sir Bartholomew the Fleming owned the property in the 13th century.  In the 16th century the property belonged to the Leslies; the Gordons acquired it.  It was in ruins by 1790, and demolished, along with a neighbouring building, shortly before 1842.

Structure
Wardhouse Castle was an enclosure castle.  Only ditches and earthworks remain.
The building was very tall, with very thick walls which had a few slit windows. The lower storey was arched; the building was reached by a drawbridge.  There was a moat.
Other than the north eastern flank the natural profile has been changed.  cropmarks showed ditches of an outer line of defence, which have been located by excavation.

See also
Castles in Great Britain and Ireland
List of castles in Scotland

References

Castles in Aberdeenshire